Loïc Loval Landré (born 28 September 1981) is a former professional footballer who played as a striker. He spent most of his career in the Netherlands for De Graafschap, Go Ahead Eagles and FC Utrecht. Born in mainland France, he was an international for the Guadeloupean national team.

Early life
Loval was born in Longjumeau, a commune in the southern suburbs of Paris, France. He grew up in neighbouring town Évry. When he was eleven, he moved with his mother and stepfather to Guadeloupe, where his parents hailed from.

Club career

Early career
Loval started at a youth player for a squad on Guadeloupe, and after a tournament in France with his team, several big French club showed their interest. He decided to play for a sport academy in Paris, and was contacted by Sochaux who signed him to their youth team. At Sochaux he, among others, was in a team with El Hadji Diouf, but after some years he left Sochaux. After some years playing for Valenciennes and Besançon, he was scouted by Cercle Brugge. He could sign a contract, but was persuaded by John van den Brom, scout for Dutch team, De Graafschap, to sign for them.

Netherlands
Loval arrived in Doetinchem in 2003. His first season with De Graafschap was successful; he scored 3 goals in 25 matches, and clinched promotion with his team through the play-offs for promotion and relegation. After 19 matches and 5 goals in the Eredivisie, Loval signed with Go Ahead Eagles in 2005, a club playing in the second-tier Eerste Divisie.

In his first season for the club from Deventer, Loval immediately became club-topscorer with 11 goals in 30 games. He was now chased by several clubs in the highest Dutch league, but finally, on 27 January 2007 he signed a contract with FC Utrecht.

He was originally signed as a midfielder, but got a place as a forward because of the lack of strikers. Loval had a contract that runs until 2011 with Utrecht, and stated that he would not play for any other Dutch club than FC Utrecht.

Return to France
In August 2010 he returned to France and signed with Vannes OC on a free transfer. It was announced that Loval left FC Utrecht due to personal reasons.

In June 2015, Loval moved to Orléans where he made 35 appearances in which he scored 8 goals in two years, and subsequently signed for FC Fleury 91, where he played in Championnat de France Amateur for the 2015–16 season; his final season playing football.

International career

Guadeloupe
Loval made his debut for Guadeloupe at the CONCACAF Gold Cup Finals in June 2007 against Haiti together with former FC Utrecht-teammate, Franck Grandel. He also played at the 2008 Caribbean Cup.

Career statistics
Scores and results list Guadeloupe's goal tally first, score column indicates score after each Loval goal.

References

External links
 Voetbal International, Monologue: Loïc Loval, 30 May 2007
 Career stats – Voetbal International 
 Career stats – L'Equipe 
 

1981 births
Living people
French footballers
French expatriate footballers
Guadeloupean footballers
FC Sochaux-Montbéliard players
Racing Besançon players
De Graafschap players
Go Ahead Eagles players
FC Utrecht players
Vannes OC players
FC Mulhouse players
US Orléans players
Eredivisie players
Eerste Divisie players
Ligue 2 players
2007 CONCACAF Gold Cup players
2009 CONCACAF Gold Cup players
2011 CONCACAF Gold Cup players
Expatriate footballers in the Netherlands
French expatriate sportspeople in the Netherlands
French people of Guadeloupean descent
Association football forwards
People from Longjumeau
Footballers from Essonne
FC Fleury 91 players
Guadeloupe international footballers